Astrophanes adonis is a species of bee flies (insects in the family Bombyliidae).

Distribution
United States, Mexico.

References

Bombyliidae
Insects described in 1886
Taxa named by Carl Robert Osten-Sacken
Diptera of North America